Mount Wilson is a census-designated place in Lincoln County, Nevada, United States. As of the 2010 census it had a population of 33.

Geography
The CDP takes its name from Mount Wilson, a  summit that rises to the east of the community and is part of the Wilson Creek Range.

Demographics

References

Census-designated places in Nevada
Census-designated places in Lincoln County, Nevada